12929 Periboea, provisional designation: , is a dark Jupiter trojan from the Trojan camp, approximately  in diameter. It was discovered on 2 October 1999, by American astronomer Charles W. Juels at the Fountain Hills Observatory in Arizona. Originally considered a centaur, this now re-classified Jovian asteroid has a rotation period of 9.3 hours and belongs to the 80 largest Jupiter trojans. It was named from Greek mythology after Periboea, mother of Pelagon by the river-god Axius.

Orbit and classification 

Periboea is a dark Jovian asteroid in a 1:1 orbital resonance with Jupiter. It is located in the trailering Trojan camp at the Gas Giant's  Lagrangian point, 60° behind its orbit . It is also a non-family asteroid of the Jovian background population.

It orbits the Sun at a distance of 5.0–5.4 AU once every 11 years and 12 months (4,378 days; semi-major axis of 5.24 AU). Its orbit has an eccentricity of 0.04 and a high inclination of 43° with respect to the ecliptic. The body's observation arc begins with a precovery taken at Palomar Observatory in September 1953, or 46 years prior to its official discovery observation at Fountain Hills.

Classification as centaur 

Periboea was originally listed by the Minor Planet Center (MPC) as a centaur.

Numbering and naming 

This minor planet was numbered by the MPC on 22 December 1999. On 14 May 2021, the object was named by the Working Group Small Body Nomenclature (WGSBN), after Periboea, a mortal woman and eldest daughter of Acessamenus from Greek mythology. Periboea was the mother of Pelagon who she conceived by way of the river god Axius. Her grandson was the Trojan ally Asteropaios.

Physical characteristics 

Periboea is an assumed C-type asteroid. It has a V–I color index of 0.88.

Rotation period 

In 2007, four rotational lightcurves of Periboea have been obtained from photometric observations with a period of 10.4 and 10.422 hours. Best-rated lightcurve, obtained by Stefano Mottola at the Calar Alto Observatory over seven nights from May to June 2009, gave a rotation period of  hours with a brightness amplitude of 0.17 magnitude.

Diameter and albedo 

According to the surveys carried out by the Japanese Akari satellite and the NEOWISE mission of NASA's Wide-field Infrared Survey Explorer, and observations by French and Spanish astronomers, Periboea measures between 51.5 and 55.34 kilometers in diameter and its surface has an albedo between 0.053 and 0.110. The Collaborative Asteroid Lightcurve Link assumes a standard albedo of a carbonaceous asteroid 0.057 and calculates a diameter of 61.04 kilometers based on an absolute magnitude of 9.8.

References

External links 
 Asteroid Lightcurve Database (LCDB), query form (info )
 Discovery Circumstances: Numbered Minor Planets (10001)-(15000) – Minor Planet Center
 Asteroid (12929) 1999 TZ1 at the Small Bodies Data Ferret
 
 

012929
Discoveries by Charles W. Juels
Named minor planets
19991002